Alexis Jan Atthill Hunter (4 November 1948 – 24 February 2014) was a New Zealand painter and photographer, who used feminist theory in her work. She lived and worked in London UK, and Beaurainville France. Hunter was also a member of the Stuckism collective.
Her archive and artistic legacy is now administered by the Alexis Hunter Trust.

Early life
Hunter's parents emigrated to New Zealand from Sydney in 1947, and she was born in Epsom, Auckland. Her twin sister is the printmaker and photographer Alyson Hunter. Hunter was raised in Titirangi in the Waitākere Ranges in Auckland.

Education and career

From 1966 to 1969, Hunter studied at Elam School of Fine Arts, where she was influenced by a tutor Colin McCahon's ethics that the artist has responsibility as a member of society. In 1970, she lived in a commune in Cairns. In 1971, she completed a teaching diploma in art and history.

In 1972 she moved to London and worked in film animation. She was a member of the Women's Workshop of the Artists Union (1972–1975) and the Woman's Free Arts Alliance. She has said that during this time of her feminist stance, "We were ridiculed in the press. We couldn't get work", and that she also found it difficult to get photo labs to print her work.

She started to study European tattoos, after listening to a lecture at the Royal Academy, which described them in a belittling way; she said, "I was angry because I know from New Zealand culture that tattooing was a very important part of Maori social structure." She took photos in the street of men with tattoos and received sexist accusations, which she rejected.

She used the image of hands in her work. A series, Approach to Fear II: Change – Decisive Action (1977), depicts red nail varnish being taken off and fingernails being cut with a razor blade. Sexual Warfare (1975) is a grid of photographs with text, where her own hands show different methods of killing a male partner, such as a pair of scissors being clutched and the text "Castrate, dedicated to Delilah". Threat and humour combine, and the word "Compete" is hand with the book, How to Make it in a Man's World. Images in the series, The Marxist Housewife (Still Does the Housework) (1978), show a manicured hand cleaning a poster of Karl Marx, referencing both class issues and Marx's lack of recognition of domestic labour in his writing. The series Identity Crisis consists of six photographs of Hunter, each taken by a different person over a two-week period, showing how they saw her, ranging from the feminity of wearing a pearl necklace to a defiant stance wearing a hard hat.

She also photographed men, in common with feminist practice of the 1970s, to reverse the traditional position of men's visualization of women - 'the male gaze'. Her Sexual Rapport series (1972–1976) consists of image of men, whom she had photographed in the street in Hoxton, London and Little Italy in New York: they include workers on lunch break and policemen, who are shown in a friendly and good-natured fashion. Hunter then marked the photographs, "Yes", "No" or "Maybe", to indicate the level of sexual rapport she felt existed with the subjects.

In 1978 her photographic exhibition Approaches to Fear was staged by Sarah Kent, who was then Exhibitions Director at the Institute of Contemporary Arts in London. That year she showed at the Hayward Annual, in 1979 at the Palais des Beaux-Arts, Brussels, and in 1981 at the Summer Show 2 at the Serpentine Gallery, London. She was included in Contemporary Acquisitions (The Imperial War Museum, London, 1981), Mythic Landscapes and Memory Series (Totah Gallery, New York, 1984), Whitechapel Open (Whitechapel Gallery, London, 1987), Alter/Image: Feminism and Representation in New Zealand Art 1973-1993 (City Gallery Wellington and Auckland Art Gallery, 1993–1994), Fantasy (Touring: United Arab Emirates and England, 1994), and  Technomyths (Whitespace Gallery, Auckland, New Zealand, 2002). She showed work in group shows at the Stuckism International Gallery in 2003.  In an interview with Lisa Sabbage, she explained how she returned to painting in the early 1980s to explore the political difficulties of the medium, using it to examine psychology and fantasy from a feminist perspective.

A revival of interest in early feminist art led her in 2007 to stage a show of older work, Alexis Hunter: Radical Feminism in the 1970s, shown at the Norwich Gallery, England, and at the Whitespace Gallery in New Zealand. Kathy Battista in Frieze said the show, "situated her practice as an important contribution to Britain's feminist movement within the visual arts." Hunter said:

The black-and-white image used for the exhibition catalogue cover from her 1970s Sexual Rapport series, showed a man's bare torso, wearing leather trousers, with the twin towers of the World Trade Center in the background as the "ultimate phallic symbols", while he holds a smoking cigarette at the level of his penis. The image sums up her "combination of intellectual inquiry into desire and subjectivity, but handled with tongue-in-cheek humour and ease."

In 2007, her work was also included in WACK! Art and the Feminist Revolution Museum of Contemporary Art (MoCA), Los Angeles, and the Stuckist show, I Won't Have Sex with You as long as We're Married, at the A Gallery in London. In 2008, she founded the Camden Stuckist group in Camden, London.

In 2013 her work   Approach to Fear XIII: Pain – Destruction of Cause 1977 was purchased by the Tate Gallery.

She lectured at art schools in the United Kingdom and other countries and in 1986 was visiting Associate Professor of Painting and Photography at University of Houston, Texas.

Personal life

Hunter was married to ex-rugby player Baxter Mitchell, who owned The Falcon Theatre and Jazz Bar in Camden, which supported independent bands such as Blur in the 1980s.

Legacy

The reputation of Alexis Hunter has continued to grow since her death in 2014 through a series of exhibitions and public purchases:

2016 - ﻿ exhibition at the
Museum of New Zealand Te Papa Tongarewa. The Model’s Revenge

2018 - exhibition with publication at Goldsmiths, University of London
Sexual Warfare

2020 - two-part exhibition at Richard Saltoun Gallery Alexis Hunter: money, art, sex - part 1 ‘A Goddess Confronting Patriarchy’; part 2 ‘Callisto’

2021 - purchase by the Tate Approach to Fear XVII - ten photographs mounted in two rows on two boards

2022 exhibition The Margate School
Passionate Instincts: paintings and boards from New Zealand days 1976 - 1988

Work in collections
Hunter's work is represented in the Tate Modern, Scottish National Gallery of Modern Art, Museum of New Zealand Te Papa Tongarewa, University of Otago and the Arts Council of Great Britain collections.

See also
Sarah Kent
Mary Kelly
Lucy Lippard
Feminist Theory

General references
Allmer, Patricia (2015) ‘Alexis Hunter’, in The Feminist Avant-Garde of the 1970, ed. Gabriele Schor, SAMMLUNG VERBUND, Vienna/Hamburger Kunsthalle.

References

1948 births
2014 deaths
Deaths from motor neuron disease
New Zealand feminists
New Zealand painters
New Zealand photographers
Contemporary painters
Stuckism
New Zealand women photographers
Elam Art School alumni
20th-century New Zealand women artists
20th-century women photographers
Photographers from Auckland